Wax flower or waxflower may refer to:

Artificial flower with wax used as adhesive
Chamelaucium, shrub endemic to Western Australia
Etlingera, herbaceous plant native to southern Asia and Australia
Hoya, climbing plant native to southern Asia
Jamesia, shrub native to western North America
Moneses, wintergreen that grows in North America

See also
 Wax plant